Jiang Yilei (born February 17, 1987), known as the online moniker Papi Jiang is a Chinese comedian known for her comedy on video blogs, where she pokes fun at everyday topics including entertainment news, dating and family relationships.

Early life 
Jiang attended China's Central Academy of Drama, where she received her bachelor and master degree. She has worked in entertainment as an actor and assistant director. Now, nicknamed "Papi Jiang", she is an internet celebrity who shot to fame by posting original sarcastic videos via social media. People called her "the No. 1 Internet Celebrity" in China in 2016. In 2019, she revealed on Go Fridge that she was the supervisor for Zhou Dongyu's Bachelor thesis, and is the owner/founder/CEO of her own Vlog production company.

Internet celebrity 
On April, 1st, 2016, Papi Jiang landed RMB 12 million (USD 1.8 million) from four investors including Zhen Fund (真格基金) and online video show Logic Talk Show (罗辑思维). Her videos received more than 290 million hits on major media platforms in just four months. Four investors bought a 12% stake for RMB 12 million, valuing Papi Jiang at RMB 100 million, according to Tencent Tech. The anchor of Logic Talk Show, another Chinese cyber celebrity, Luo Zhenyu, was surprised by her quick rise to popularity. He said “Papi Jiang appealed 8 million followers only within a few months, but I obtained 6 million using the past three years through creating stories with rich information”.

On June 21, 2018, she became the Chief Content Officer of Baidu App.

Comedy videos 
One of her most popular videos is a rant about when people in love are engaged in PDA (Public Displays of Affection). She also parodied white-collar young women who gossip about and trash their more attractive colleague for sleeping with the boss. In another series of popular videos she parodies people who talk in a mixture of Shanghai's regional dialect, English and the occasional Japanese phrase. In July 2016 her first live broadcast, a 90-minute video, attracted 74 million views in one day.  She was featured in an article in the New York Times in August 2016.

Influence 
Media commented on her recent funding as a sign that China's domestic investors are willing to pay for original content.

Posting these satirical videos became her full-time job. She posted on Chinese social media such as Sina Weibo and Douban, as well as via global media such as YouTube.

Controversy 
In April 2016, China’s broadcast regulator ordered her to clean up the foul language in her videos, which occurs once in a while.  They made her take down most of the videos at least temporarily, which was seen as the government’s message that it desires to assert its control over this kind of online content.

Jiang retracted her apology.

References

1987 births
Living people
Chinese women comedians
Chinese Internet celebrities
Central Academy of Drama alumni
Actresses from Shanghai
Baidu people